Muhammed Mehmet Damar (born 9 April 2004) is a German professional footballer who plays as a midfielder for Bundesliga club 1899 Hoffenheim.

Professional career
Damar is a youth product of the academies of Schöneberg, Hertha Zehlendorf, Hertha Berlin, and Eintracht Frankfurt. On 7 July 2022, he transferred to Hoffenheim. He made his professional debut with Hoffenheim in a 3–1 Bundesliga loss to Borussia Mönchengladbach on 6 August 2022.

International career
Born in Germany, Damar is of Turkish descent. He is a youth international for Germany, having played for the Germany U18s in 2022.

References

External links
 
 
 Bundesliga profile

2004 births
Living people
Footballers from Berlin
German footballers
Germany youth international footballers
German people of Turkish descent
TSG 1899 Hoffenheim players
Bundesliga players
Association football midfielders